Rupin may refer to:

Places 
Rupin, Maków County, Masovian Voivodeship, Poland
Rupin, Ostrołęka County, Masovian Voivodeship, Poland
Rupin, Podlaskie Voivodeship, Poland

People 
 Jury Rupin (1946–2008), Ukrainian photographer
 Pacôme Rupin (born 1985), French politician